Robert Dowdell (March 10, 1932 – January 23, 2018) was an American actor, best known for his role as Lieutenant Commander Chip Morton in the television series Voyage to the Bottom of the Sea.

Biography
Dowdell was born in Park Ridge, Illinois, a suburb of Chicago, and later graduated Parker High School. He attended Wesleyan University and the University of Chicago, before enlisting in the United States Army Corps of Engineers.

After discharging from the service, Dowdell took an interest in acting. It was suggested that he take lessons with Wynn Handman. He was cast in a play written by Leslie Stevens, who went on to create the Western television series Stoney Burke and encouraged him to audition. Dowdell was cast in the recurring role of Cody Bristol. Following Stoney Burke, Dowdell was cast in Voyage, which aired from 1964 to 1968. Over the next 30 years, he continued to act in various stage, film, and television productions before retiring in 1995.

Personal life
Dowdell was married to actress Sheila Connolly from 1965 until their divorce in 1979. He did not have any children.

Death
Dowdell died of natural causes on January 23, 2018, at age 85 in Coldwater, Michigan.

Filmography

Film

Television

References

External links
 
 
 1968 Bio from 20th Century Fox

1932 births
2018 deaths
Actors from Park Ridge, Illinois
American male film actors
American male stage actors
American male television actors
Male actors from Chicago
Military personnel from Illinois
United States Army Corps of Engineers personnel
University of Chicago alumni
Wesleyan University alumni
20th-century American male actors